Nenad "Neško" Milovanović (born 15 August 1969) is a Serbian football manager and former player.

During his managerial career, Milovanović worked at Mladost Lučani, Borac Čačak, Jagodina, Metalac Gornji Milanovac and Napredak Kruševac.

Career
Milovanović served as manager of Mladost Lučani during the 2007–08 Serbian SuperLiga. He subsequently took charge at Borac Čačak while the club participated in the 2008–09 UEFA Cup, being eliminated by Dutch side Ajax in the first round. In June 2012, Milovanović was appointed manager of Napredak Kruševac. He led the team to a convincing first-place finish in the 2012–13 Serbian First League, before resigning from the position.

In early 2014, Milovanović returned to Mladost Lučani, helping them win the 2013–14 Serbian First League and gain promotion to the top flight. They later finished in fourth place in the 2016–17 Serbian SuperLiga, securing a spot in the 2017–18 UEFA Europa League. In the following season, Milovanović reached the Serbian Cup final, eventually losing to Partizan. He was appointed as sporting director of Mladost Lučani in July 2019, thus leaving his managerial role after five and a half years.

Honours
Napredak Kruševac
 Serbian First League: 2012–13
Mladost Lučani
 Serbian First League: 2013–14
 Serbian Cup: Runner-up 2017–18

References

External links
 
 

1969 births
Living people
Sportspeople from Čačak
Association football midfielders
FK Mladost Lučani managers
FK Borac Čačak managers
FK Jagodina managers
FK Mladost Lučani players
FK Napredak Kruševac managers
Serbia national under-21 football team managers
Serbian football managers
Serbian SuperLiga managers
Yugoslav footballers